Juan Sebastián Cabal and Robert Farah successfully defended their title by defeating Marcelo Demoliner and João Souza 6–3, 7–6(7–4) in the final.

Seeds

Draw

Draw

References
 Main Draw

Seguros Bolivar Open Cali - Doubles
2012 Doubles